American actor, director, and producer John Wayne (1907–1979) began working on films as an extra, prop man and stuntman, mainly for the Fox Film Corporation. He frequently worked in minor roles with director John Ford and when Raoul Walsh suggested him for the lead in The Big Trail (1930), an epic Western shot in an early widescreen process called Fox Grandeur, Ford vouched for him. Wayne's early period as a star would be brief, as Fox dropped him after only three leads. He then appeared in a string of low-budget action films (mostly Westerns) before garnering more recognition with the 1939 film Stagecoach.

During the 1940s and early 1950s, Wayne starred in Dark Command (1940), Reap the Wild Wind (1942), Wake of the Red Witch (1948), Fort Apache (1948), She Wore a Yellow Ribbon (1949), Rio Grande (1950), and Red River (1948). Some of his more notable war movies include Flying Tigers (1942), The Fighting Seabees (1944), They Were Expendable (1945), and Sands of Iwo Jima (1949), for which he was nominated for an Academy Award for Best Actor.

The 1950s would see Wayne star in an Ireland-set romantic comedy The Quiet Man (1952) and two westerns, The Searchers (1956) and Rio Bravo (1959). Wayne also continued his producing activities during this period, and formed his own production company, Batjac. During the 1960s and 1970s, Wayne starred in more Westerns, such as The Comancheros (1961), The Man Who Shot Liberty Valance (1962), and True Grit (1969), in which his role as Rooster Cogburn earned him an Academy Award for Best Actor. He would reprise that role in the 1975 film Rooster Cogburn. He also played in several war films, including The Longest Day (1962) and In Harm's Way (1965).

Wayne starred in his final film, The Shootist  in 1976, ending his acting career of 50 years, 169 feature length films, and various other television appearances or voice-overs.

Filmography

As actor

As himself

As producer only

Box office popularity
Results from Quigley's Motion Picture Herald annual poll of film exhibitors would determine the year's "Top Ten Stars". John Wayne appeared on the list every time between 1949 and 1973 with one exception – 1958 – indicating that he was one of cinema's most durable stars.

Notes

Sources
 Boswell, John; David, Jay (1979). The John Wayne Album. New York: Ballantine Books. .
 Eyles, Allan (1979). John Wayne. New York: A.S. Barnes & Co. .
 Fagen, Herb (2003). The Encyclopedia of Westerns. New York: Facts On File. .
 Landesman, Fred (2004). The John Wayne Filmography. Jefferson, NC: McFarland. .

References

External links
 

Male actor filmographies
American filmographies
John Wayne